The 1988 United States presidential election in Oregon took place on November 8, 1988, as part of the 1988 United States presidential election. Voters chose seven electors of the Electoral College, who voted for president and vice president.

Oregon was won by Democratic nominee Massachusetts governor Michael Dukakis over Republican nominee Vice President George H. W. Bush. Oregon was one of just ten states won by Dukakis in an election overwhelmingly won by Bush. It also marked the first victory by a Democratic presidential candidate in Oregon since 1964; Democrats have won every presidential election in Oregon since then, although Bush's son and later Republican candidate George W. Bush came extremely close to winning the state in 2000 and only lost it by a somewhat slender margin in 2004. Bush's loss marked the first time that a Republican was elected President while losing Oregon since Ulysses S. Grant in 1868.

, this is the last occasion Washington County has voted for a Republican presidential nominee, the only time since 1948 where Oregon has not voted for the same candidate as neighboring California, and the last time that Oregon voted to the left of neighboring Washington.

Results

Results by county

See also
 United States presidential elections in Oregon
 Presidency of George H. W. Bush

Notes

References

Oregon
1988
President